Pauline Brunius, née Emma Maria Pauline Lindstedt (10 February 1881 in Stockholm – 30 March 1954 in Stockholm) was a Swedish stage and film actor, screenwriter and film and theatre director. She was the managing director of the Royal Dramatic Theatre from 1938 to 1948.

Biography
Born in 1881, Brunius became a ballet student in 1891, but ended her ballet studies in favor of spoken drama. She was engaged at the theatre Olympiateatern in 1902. Jointly with her spouse (John W. Brunius) and colleague, Gösta Ekman (senior), she was the managing director of the theatre Oscarsteatern in 1926–1932. In 1938, she was engaged as the managing director of the Royal Dramatic Theatre.

Married 1909–1935 with actor John W. Brunius. She was the mother of actress Anne-Marie Brunius and actor Palle Brunius.

Selected filmography
Thora van Deken (1920)
Gyurkovicsarna (1920)
 A Wild Bird (1921)
 The Eyes of Love (1922)
The Blizzard (1923)
Charles XII (1925)
 Gustaf Wasa (1928)
The Doctor's Secret (1930)
Charlotte Löwensköld (1930)
 False Greta (1934)

Sources

Further reading

External links

1881 births
1954 deaths
Swedish theatre directors
Swedish stage actresses
Swedish film actresses
Swedish silent film actresses
20th-century Swedish actresses
Swedish film directors
Swedish women film directors
Litteris et Artibus recipients
Burials at Galärvarvskyrkogården